Chupli Tappeh (also Romanized as Chūplī Tappeh and Chūblī Tappeh; also known as Tappeh) is a village in Atrak Rural District, Maneh District, Maneh and Samalqan County, North Khorasan Province, Iran. At the 2006 census, its population was 531, in 138 families.

References 

Populated places in Maneh and Samalqan County